Puka Mach'ay (Quechua puka red, mach'ay cave, "red cave", also spelled Pucamachay) is a mountain in Peru which reaches a height of approximately  . It is located in the Junín Region, Yauli Province, Morococha District.

References

Mountains of Peru
Mountains of Junín Region